The Guam national under-18 basketball team is a national basketball team of Guam, administered by the Guam Basketball Confederation.

It represents the country in international under-18 (under age 18) basketball competitions.

See also
Guam men's national basketball team
Guam women's national under-18 basketball team

References

External links
Guam Basketball Records at FIBA Archive

Basketball teams in Guam
Men's national under-18 basketball teams
Basketball